Kralj Dmitar Zvonimir (pennant number RTOP-12) is a  in service with the Croatian Navy. Like its sister ship , Kralj Dmitar Zvonimir features a mixture of Western and Eastern equipment including a Swedish forward gun and anti-ship missiles as well as Russian-built propulsion and close-in weapon system (CIWS).

Although the ship was laid down in 1993, it was not until 2001 it was launched and commissioned, still lacking complete armament. Even though they belong to the same class, Kralj Dimtar Zvonimir features slight changes compared to Kralj Petar Krešimir IV. These include an altered bridge, longer hull and digitalised control of the propulsion.

Notes

References 

2001 ships
Ships built in Croatia
Kralj-class fast attack craft
Missile boats